is a Japanese businessperson and auto racing driver. He founded Yuke's, a video game developer company, in Sakai, Osaka in 1993.

Early career
As a child, Taniguchi became an enthusiastic arcade gamer, spending much time on early arcade games such as Space Invaders. By the time of high school, he was programming his own game and started working under contract for a local game company in Hiroshima. Two years later, he transferred to a highschool in U.S. and graduated from it in 1989. He entered into Osaka Prefecture University as an Engineering student but at the same time, he obtained a post as the chief of Osaka development department of Compile. In 1993, when he was 24 and in his third year of university, he set up his own company, Yuke's, in his own flat in Osaka and developed about 20 games before he graduated from the university.

Yuke's

Professional wrestling
In 1993, Taniguchi founded his own company, Yuke's, at his apartment in Sakai, Osaka. He developed about 20 games until his graduation from the university. After the graduation, he hit on the development of professional wrestling games to make use of 3D graphics performance of PlayStation thus his company's Toukon Retsuden, put on the market from Tomy in 1995. Unlike other 3D fighting games in the market which emphasised button mashing, Tokonretuden's game mechanics combined Submission-grapple-attack like rock-paper-scissor, launching the title in Japan and selling over a million copies.

The success of the Toukon Retsuden series made Yuke's obtain capital and the company developed Evil Zone the first game to sell under the name of the Yuke's. The game did not succeed in Japan but the loss has recovered by sales in foreign countries, particularly from the USA. Because of this experience, he determined to aim at a United States market and developed WWF SmackDown!. The game that had been put on the market in 2000 not only was sold 2 million in the United States but also made success also in Japan. In Japan, the game contributed to the eminence improvement of World Wrestling Entertainment (WWE) that was the base of the game.

In 2005, Taniguchi bought controlling 51% stake of slumping New Japan Pro-Wrestling (which Tokonretuden was based on) as a white knight. This action has further raised his eminence among the professional wrestling fan in Japan.

Racing career

Taniguchi supported Nobushige Kumakubo's Team Orange (Team Yuke's) in the D1 Grand Prix and Yuke's developed game series of the event.

He entered in some spec racing series as a driver. In 2005, he competed in Super Taikyu on Nissan 350Z with Tarzan Yamada and became series champion. In 2007, he competed in the Japan Le Mans Challenge, and won a race and became runner-up in the season.

In 2008 Taniguchi competed in two rounds of the FIA World Touring Car Championship (WTCC) in a Honda Accord for the N. Technology team alongside regular driver James Thompson. After a break, Taniguchi returned to the WTCC in 2010 with Bamboo Engineering, racing in the final three events of the season in a Chevrolet Lacetti, previously driven by Harry Vaulkhard. He joined Wiechers-Sport for the 2013 FIA WTCC Race of Japan to replace their regular driver Fredy Barth who had other commitments.

Racing record

Complete World Touring Car Championship results
(key) (Races in bold indicate pole position) (Races in italics indicate fastest lap)

* Season still in progress.

Complete Super GT results

References

External links
 
 As president of Yuke's - 

1968 births
Living people
Sportspeople from Hiroshima
Japanese businesspeople
Japanese video game designers
Japanese racing drivers
World Touring Car Championship drivers
Super GT drivers
Asian Le Mans Series drivers
Campos Racing drivers
KCMG drivers
Craft-Bamboo Racing drivers